Mecodema oconnori is a large-bodied species of ground beetle endemic to the lower half of the North Island, New Zealand. It is mainly found in native forest habitats on the western side of the Tararua and Ruahine Ranges, but is also found in the Manawatu Gorge and some other eastern localities.

Diagnosis 
Differs from other North Island Mecodema species by:

 its large and robust body size; 
 elytral intervals 8 and 9 terminating short of basal margin; 
 apical shape of the penis lobe; 
 the setal distribution along the ventral edge of the left paramere.

Description 
Length 29–34 mm, pronotal width 7.9–10.4 mm, elytral width 9.3–11.7 mm. Colour of head and pronotum glossy black, elytra matte black, ventral surface dark reddish-brown to black, including legs (may be a darker red).

Natural history 
Mecodema oconnori is one of the few species of New Zealand carabids that has any published ecological or life history studies and/or observations. This species is relatively long-lived and only produces a small number of eggs in a season. The female broods the eggs, as well as the larvae, in a burrow beneath logs or rocks.

References

Beetles of New Zealand
oconnori
Beetles described in 1912
Endemic fauna of New Zealand
Endemic insects of New Zealand